Sarah Stevens may refer to:
 Sarah Stevens (politician) (born 1960), member of the North Carolina General Assembly
 Sarah Stephens (born 1990), Australian model and actress
 Sara Stevens (born 1974), American politician from Maine